Moto Morini is an Italian  motorcycle manufacturer founded by Alfonso Morini in Bologna, in 1937.

Earlier, Morini had also manufactured motorcycles together with Mario Mazzetti under the name MM. Moto Morini came under Cagiva control in 1987, then in 1996 joined Texas Pacific Group, which had also bought Ducati, and in April 1999, the rights to the name were purchased by Morini Franco Motori spa, a company which had been founded by Morini's nephew in 1954. After building large v-twin motorcycles early in the 21st century the company went into liquidation in late 2010. Moto Morini restarted motorcycle production in 2012.

History
Alfonso Morini was born on 22 January 1898. Before he was 16 he was repairing motorcycles, and at the age of sixteen, opened a workshop. This was just before World War I broke out. During the war he was with the 8th Motorcycles Unit, stationed at Padua.

MM
In 1925 Mario Mazzetti, impressed by Alfonso's work, asked him to build a single-cylinder 120 cc two-stroke racing bike, making Alfonso the designer, constructor, and racer. They were successful racing, under the MM name, and Alfonso's finest racing moment came in 1927 when his MM 125 took six world records at Monza, during the Grand Prix of Nations. (These records were not bettered for twenty years.) In 1933 he set a new world speed record for 175 cc motorcycles of 162 km/h.

Moto Morini three wheelers
In 1937 Alfonso and Mario parted ways, and Alfonso Morini went into the production of 350 cc and 500 cc three wheelers, under the Moto Morini name. The government regulations favoured these lighter fuel efficient machines, and the successful Moto Morini M610 had advanced features, like cardan driveshafts.

This was interrupted by World War II, and Moto Morini was converted to produce aeronautical components. In 1943 the factory was bombed.

Motorcycles

Undeterred, in 1946, a new three-speed transmission, single cylinder, two-stroke T125 emerged from the new Bologna factory, Via Berti. In 1947 a Sport version appeared. In 1953 a 175 cc pushrod OHV four-stroke model appeared in production. Models like Gran Turismo, Settebello, Rebello, Supersport, Briscola, Tresette, and Tresette Sprint also appeared. In 1956 Moto Morini moved to a larger production facility at Via Bergami. In 1958 Alfonso Morini, Dante Lambertini, and Nerio Biavati designed the 250 GP Double Camshaft.

On 30 June 1969 Alfonso Morini died. He was 71. His daughter, Gabriella Morini, took over management, and would remain in control until 1986. In 1970 Franco Lambertini (unrelated to the earlier Dante Lambertini of Morini's technical staff) left Ferrari works and joined Moto Morini.

Competition history

In 1948, Raffaele Alberti won the Italian Championship for Lightweight Motorcycles on a two-stroke 125 Competition. Umberto Masetti won the Italian Championship for Lightweight Motorcycles in 1949, on a 125 SOHC four-stroke that produced  @ 10000 rpm, and could exceed . In 1952 Moto Morini won races outside of Italy with the 125 SOHC four-stroke, as Emilio Mendogni won both the Nations Grand Prix, and the Spanish Grand Prix.

In 1961, Giacomo Agostini began his racing career on a Moto Morini Settebello “Short Rods”, coming second at Trento-Bondone. Agostini was Italian Cadet Champion in 1962, and Italian Junior Champion in 1963. Tarquinio Provini, riding a Moto Morini 250 GP, won the Italian Championship in 1961 and 1962. In 1963, Provini convinced Alfonso Morini that they should try for the World Championship. Provini would wage a season-long battle with Honda's Jim Redman for the 250 world championship. Each rider won four races and the title wasn't decided until the final race in Japan, the Japanese team (250 4cyl) would not let Provini practise before the race to hinder Morini's chances  with Redman just winning the championship over Provini by two points. The single Cyl 250 Morini is still the fastest single cyl (4t) 250 racer to this day.

Moto Morini 350 & 500 V-twins

In the early 1970s, Moto Morini launched their first 72° V-twin engined motorcycles, designed by Franco Lambertini, and created by Franco and Gino Marchesini. The 350 Sport and Strada models displaced 344 cc and were complemented in 1977 by 500 cc Sport and Strada models. Equipment on the models was of high-spec and when released the Morini 3½ was around the same price as a Honda CB750.

The Morini 3½ still has a loyal following and a number of spare parts are available from specialist firms. The former editor of Classic Bike magazine, veteran motorcycle writer Hugo Wilson, has owned a 3½ Sport since 1982 and still uses it as a regular commuter motorbike.

The engine featured Heron heads, which were milled flat and the combustion chamber is recessed in the piston crown, aiding combustion and returning excellent fuel economy. A fuel consumption test by Motorcycling Monthly at Britain's Motor Industry Research Association in 1976 returned a performance of  while a 3½ bike carried rider and pillion passenger. Front and rear barrels and heads are interchangeable. VBH Dell'Orto (25 mm VHB 25 BS) square slide carburettors were fitted to the 350, with air fed via air-box with two filters. The camshaft was driven by a small toothed belt, and was a revolutionary advance. They also included an electronic capacitor discharge ignition system designed by Ducati Elettronica. Early models had kick-start only but later ones also included a starter motor using three centrifugal friction shoes engaging the alternator rotor cover. The CDI ignition was powered by a coil in the alternator and using the kick-start a bike could be started and ridden with a flat battery.

The frame is a full steel duplex swingarm design, with Ceriani rear suspension, and Marzocchi front forks. The early models had a twin leading shoe drum brake up front (Strada:  drum, Sport:  drum) that was notoriously grabby on the Borrani spoked wheels, but these were replaced with a single chromed  Grimeca disc in 1976, and later optional double discs. The rear drum brake was replaced in the early 1980s with a Grimeca disc. Switchgear, tail and brake lights were the standard CEV model used on many Italian motorcycles of the 1970s. The month and year of manufacture is embossed in small figures on the side of each cast wheel, near where one of the seven cast spokes meets the rim. The helical gear transmission was a six-speed, with a top gear ratio of 1:0.954, making it akin to an overdrive. The transmission was engaged with a six-plate dry clutch, making a characteristic rattle similar to Ducatis when disengaged. Secondary drive was by a 5/8 x 3/8-inch chain to a rear sprocket with cush drive. Gear change is by right foot and the rear brake operated by left foot. Engine lubrication was by oil pump to the crankshaft but no force lubrication went to the rocker gear. Instead, crankcase pressure forced oil mist up the short pushrod tunnels to the rocker covers, where two 'crow's feet' allowed mist to condense and drip onto the rocker gear. Although ingenious, it required riders to gentle warm up their engines before using maximum revs, redlined at 9,200 rpm. Oil filtration was by plastic mesh filter.

The 1979 model incorporated a moulded tank-hugging seat, black crankcase side covers and a black exhaust system in homage to the Moto Guzzi Le Mans.

Footrests were placed too far forward for many riders and a common modification was to replace them with rearset footrests. Although not suitable for large riders, the 3½ was renowned for sharp and impeccable handling and was able to compete against larger capacity motorbikes on twisty roads. Maximum torque was above 6,000 rpm and so required high revving, similar to a two-stroke, to make the most of the engine's characteristics. Nevertheless, a 3½ Sport could still return  when ridden hard. The 3½ Sport had a higher compression ratio than the softer-tuned Strada. The Sport featured Tomaselli clip-ons handlebars and throttle, a steering damper and Veglia instruments.

In November 1981 a 500 Turbo was shown at the Milan Show, producing  at 8,300 rpm. It did not make it to production. An enduro version called the Camel 500 was released in 1981. In 1983 the Kanguro 350 was released.

In 1986 Moto Morini brought out a cruiser version, the Excalibur, available in 350 and 500 versions.

The 350 was conceived as a modular design, and single cylinder versions were made. (Looking like the V-twin with the rear cylinder removed) These were the 1975 six-speed 125 H and the 1978 250 T Mono, both unsuccessful, as was the later KJ 125 single of 1985.

350 performance figures
Strada  @ 8,000 rpm top speed 162kmh
Sport  @ 8,500 rpm,  @ 6,100 rpm.
Weight 145 kg
Top Speed 175kmh (108.7 mph)

500 performance figures
  @7,500 rpm
Sport top Speed 172kmh (104 mph)
Sport dry weight

Cagiva

The early 1980s did not go as well for Moto Morini, with labour disputes and diminishing sales. On 18 February 1987 Gabriella Morini sold the firm to the Castiglioni firm, Cagiva. Despite their assurances that Moto Morini was important to them, the company was allowed to decline.

In 1988 the Dart 350, a fully race-faired version of the 72° V-twin, appeared. A 400 version was made in a small batch for the Japanese marked. In 1989 the last enduro version, the Coguaro appeared, in 350 and 500 versions, and another cruiser version, the New York, also in both capacities. These were extensions of other models, and little to no development was being undertaken.

Franco Lambertini had a new 60° engine design, but Cagiva was not interested. In the same year as the last models appeared, he left Moto Morini, and went to Piaggio-Gilera.

The Via Bergami factory was closed and by 1993 Excaliburs are assembled at Agostini works.

In 1996 Ducati and the Moto Morini name are sold to TPG. There were no plans to revive Moto Morini.

Morini Franco Motori spa
In 1999, Morini Franco Motori spa bought the Moto Morini name from Ducati. Morini Franco Motori spa was founded in 1954 by Franco Morini, Alfonso's nephew. A new joint-stock company was officially presented in 2003, and the principal Moto Morini SPA shareholders were the Berti and Morini families.

Corsaro 1200, 9½, Corsaro Veloce, 1200 Sport, 1200 Avio and Scrambler 

In 2004, a new motorcycle was announced, the Corsaro 1200 naked bike, which appeared in 2005. It was followed by the "9½" road bike. There was criticism of the snatchy fuel injection mapping in these early models; however, power delivery was improved in time.

The engine was designed by Franco Lambertini, who was the young engineer responsible for the "3½" model in the 1970s. The engines were tuned differently for different applications.

On 10 October 2006, a Corsaro Veloce 1200 was announced.
In 2008, at the "Padova Motorcycles" fair, the 1200 Sport was announced (and went into production) together with the Scrambler, that was afterwards produced, from 2009, just in few pieces due to the sudden financial impasse of the company

Granferro : the unrealised dream

At the end of 2009, the latest marketing attempt by Morini was almost ready to enter the market : the hypermotard "Granferro", designed by Rodolfo Frascoli (of Marabese Design). The production was due to commence in April 2010. The company was already in financial turmoil and mass production was not realized.

Bankruptcy, liquidation and sale
The company went into voluntary liquidation in 2009, after failing to pay suppliers or staff in September while hoping to find further financing. Paolo Berlusconi – brother of Italian prime minister Silvio Berlusconi – was interested in buying Morini. He already owned the Garelli brand. However, he could not reach an agreement with the labour unions and he pulled off from the venture.

By July 2010, interested buyers could download a pdf of bike stock held by the company and being sold on a direct basis to customers. Prices in the "fire sale" included four red 2007 Moto Morini 9½s selling for €3,600 each, while other cheap deals included €4,800 for Corsaro Neros and also a stock of 42 variously coloured 1200 Sports selling for €5,760 each.

Some staff were recalled in early 2011 by the liquidator to construct a number of bikes from spare part stock. Liquidator Piero Aicardi believed there were enough parts left in the factory to build as many as 45 bikes, with the production being split between 16 Scramblers and 29 Granpasso, seven of which would use frames originally built for the stillborn Granferro.

After the sale of around 40 bikes assembled from remaining parts the company and the intellectual property were put up for sale in April 2011. Many potential bidders emerged; but the sale did not go through.

Finally, in July 2011, the company was sold to Eagle Bike, a newly formed company that is run by two Italian entrepreneurs, Sandro Capotosti and Ruggeromassimo Jannuzzelli, for 1.96 million Euros. The factory was not included in the sale although they are thought to have a two-year lease on the premises.

2012, back on the market 

In March 2012, the factory announced online auctioning of coupon in order to win a completely new and in limited edition model. It is the Rebello 1200 Giubileo, reinterpretation of the namesake bike from 1956. At the end of the auction Moto Morini built 20 specimens of it to celebrate the 75 years of the brand.

In 2013 the Moto Morini range included Corsaro Veloce, Scrambler 1200 and Granpasso 1200. About 30 employees are involved in a production of 70 handmade and handcrafted specimens with spare parts coming mostly from Italy. The initial recovery program planned the achievement of a production capacity up to 5000 bikes per year and the employment of 100 workers before 2016. In the new production system the bikes are assembled by hand on customers' request.

Also in 2013, Moto Morini launched the bike rent forms that allowed clients to rent Moto Morini motorcycles for a short period of time. It also introduced the "buy-back" system: a long term rent that allows customers to pay a monthly fee and decide, after some time, whether to keep the motorcycle or give it back to the factory. Sampler bikes and rented bikes were then sold at reduced prices. At the end of 2013 Moto Morini signed an agreement with the Indian company Vardenchi to provide them with engines.

In the summer of 2014 the headquarters and all Moto Morini locations moved from Casalecchio di Reno (BO) to Trivolzio (PV). Meanwhile, a new model was launched: the Moto Morini 11 1/2.
In November 2014 a temporary shop in Milan was opened where Moto Morini showed the updated range.

In 2015 the company management changed and so did the trade policy: Moto Morini concludes contracts with dealers and distributors and ended the online sale. Moreover, also the production strategy changed, taking Moto Morini more and more to a direction where quality and customization are at the heart of the production. A Granpasso's makeover intended for the Japanese market, called Granpasso R, is launched. The specific characteristics of this model is the reduced ground clearance.

In 2016 Moto Morini increased the commercial structure in order to better manage the new sales network.
In November Moto Morini returned to the 2016 edition of Eicma after seven years of absence with a new model: the Corsaro ZZ. Thanks to the presence at the International exhibition and a media campaign, Moto Morini appeared in many motorcycles magazines. In that period also the Facebook page was reopened.

In 2017 the 11 1/2 was no longer produced and the Moto Morini range included: Scrambler 1200, Granpasso 1200, Granpasso R, Corsaro 1200 ZZ. The Corsaro is the first Moto Morini model in Euro 4, with ABS and electronic gear shift. Furthermore, the lightning system is fully LED, the fuel tank is in aluminium and several body parts are made of carbon fiber as standard. Taking the bike to have the 99% of its components made in Italy.
All the motorcycles are hand assembled, from the engine to the final product. In 2017 Moto Morini launched also the new One-off department, an internal area dedicated to customized models on clients' requests. 
To celebrate the 80 years of the company (1937 - 2017) Moto Morini created a limited edition of 8 specimens of a special Corsaro, called Corsaro80. This special model is improved with more body parts made of carbon fiber and hand hammered aluminium.

In July 2017 Moto Morini re-entered the bicycles market. As a matter of fact the company was already selling bicycles in the Sixties. Nowadays, it has introduced a limited edition model of e-bike. The frame in completely in aluminium for a total weight of 13.5 kg. The engine and the battery are designed by the Politecnico di Milano and are both hidden in the hub, creating a more appealing look. Moto Morini produced 30 specimens of the pedal assisted bike in order to test the market. 
At the end of 2017, due to the success of the first e-bike, Moto Morini launched a range of four more models: Gravel, City, Urban and Sport. They all have the innovative Frame Block system: a solution integrated in the frame that works as a locker.

In Novemberì 2017 Moto Morini is present again at EICMA, exhibiting the Corsaro 1200 ZZ MY2018, the Milano, The Scrambler 1200 MY2018.
The new Moto Morini Milano pays an homage to the famous Moto Morini 3 1/2, historic model of the company. In addition to that, Moto Morini showed also a customized version of the Corsaro ZZ, called Corsaro Ti22.
In the spring of 2018 a new version of Corsaro, the Corsaro ZT, will be on the market.

In the fall of 2018 it was announced that ownership had transferred to Zhongneng Vehicle Group.

Current models (2021)

Past models

Road

Dual sport

Palmares

Italian Speed championship

See also 

List of Italian companies
List of motorcycle manufacturers

Notes

References
(1) "Italian Motorcycles " Number 4.(magazine), Page 56 Article, The Bologna Alternative by Finn McCoul, Federal Publishing, 1997.

External links

The Moto Morini website

 
Motorcycle manufacturers of Italy
Cycle manufacturers of Italy
Electric bicycles
Manufacturing companies based in Bologna
Vehicle manufacturing companies established in 1937
Italian companies established in 1937
Italian brands